Sister or Sisters Island or Islands may refer to several individual islands or island groups:

Antarctic
 The Sisters, a pair of Antarctic islands consisting of Gertrude Rock and Rose Rock

Australia
 Sisters Islands (Queensland)
 Sisters Island (Tasmania), north-west Tasmania
 Sisters Island Group, Tasmania, Furneaux Group
 Inner Sister Island
 Outer Sister Island
 Shag Reef

Canada
 Sisters Islands (Nunavut), Canada
 East Sister Island, Lake Erie, Ontario

Cayman Islands
 Little Cayman
 Cayman Brac

India
 The Sisters (Andaman), two islands in the Duncan Passage, Andaman Islands, India
 East Sister Island (Andaman)
 West Sister Island (Andaman)

New Zealand
 The Sisters/Rangitatahi, Chatham Islands

Singapore
 Sisters' Islands

United States
 Sister Islands (Wisconsin)
 The Sisters (California)
 Middle Sister Island, Lake Erie, Ohio
 West Sister Island, Lake Erie, Ohio
 Sisters Island, Michigan, in Monroe County
 A small group of islands just northwest of Grand Isle (island) in Lake Champlain

See also
Three Sisters Islands (disambiguation)